is a Japanese softball player who won the gold medal at the 2008 Summer Olympics. She plays as an outfielder.

References

1982 births
Japanese softball players
Living people
Olympic softball players of Japan
Olympic gold medalists for Japan
Softball players at the 2008 Summer Olympics
Olympic medalists in softball
Asian Games medalists in softball
Medalists at the 2008 Summer Olympics
Softball players at the 2010 Asian Games
Softball players at the 2006 Asian Games
Medalists at the 2006 Asian Games
Medalists at the 2010 Asian Games
Asian Games gold medalists for Japan
21st-century Japanese women